The 2010–11 international cricket season was from October 2010 to April 2011. It included the 2011 Cricket World Cup, won by co-host India.

Season overview

Pre-season rankings

September

Ireland in Canada

Ireland in Zimbabwe

October

Australia in India

Afghanistan in Kenya

New Zealand in Bangladesh

Zimbabwe in South Africa

Pakistan vs South Africa in UAE

November

Sri Lanka in Australia

ICC WCL Division Eight

Group stage
The ICC development committee confirmed the groups on 10 June 2010.

Final Placings

New Zealand in India

Asian Games

West Indies in Sri Lanka

England in Australia

December

Zimbabwe in Bangladesh

India in South Africa

Pakistan in New Zealand

January

WCL Division Three

Group stage

Final Placings

February

World Cup

Warm-up matches

Group stage

Knockout

References

External links
2010/11 season in ESPN Cricinfo

2010 in cricket
2011 in cricket